The 2019 NCAA Division I Men's Basketball Championship Game was the final game of the single-elimination tournament to determine the men's National Collegiate Athletic Association (NCAA) Division I college basketball national champion for the 2018–19 season. The game was played on April 8, 2019, at U.S. Bank Stadium in Minneapolis, Minnesota, between the Texas Tech Red Raiders and the Virginia Cavaliers. It was the first time since 1979 that both teams in the national championship game were making their first such appearance. The Cavaliers defeated the Red Raiders, 85–77 in overtime, to win their first national title. Kyle Guy was named the NCAA basketball tournament Most Outstanding Player.

Participants

Texas Tech

Texas Tech, led by third-year head coach Chris Beard, finished the regular season with a record of 26–5. They posted a 14–4 conference record, earning them the No. 2 seed in the Big 12 tournament, where they lost to No. 10 seed West Virginia in their first game. In the NCAA Tournament, the Red Raiders received a No. 3 seed in the West Regional. They defeated No. 14 seed Northern Kentucky and No. 6 seed Buffalo to reach the Sweet Sixteen, where they upset No. 2 seed Michigan by nineteen points. Two days later, they defeated No. 1 seed Gonzaga to win the West Regional. In their first Final Four, the Red Raiders overcame a challenge from the East Regional champions, No. 2 seed Michigan State, whom they defeated 61–51 to reach their first ever NCAA title game.

Jarrett Culver, a sophomore, was named the Big 12 Conference Men's Basketball Player of the Year.

Virginia

The Cavaliers were coming off a year they had gone from an unranked team all the way to AP No. 1, only to become the first No. 1 seed to lose in the first round of the NCAA Tournament. Led by tenth-year head coach Tony Bennett, Virginia finished the regular season with a record of 28–2. They posted a 16–2 conference record, earning them the No. 1 seed in the ACC tournament, where they defeated No. 8 seed NC State, before losing to No. 4 seed Florida State. In the NCAA Tournament, the Cavaliers earned a No. 1 seed in the South Regional. The Cavaliers defeated No. 16 seed and NCAA tournament debutants Gardner–Webb in the first round, and No. 9 seed Oklahoma in the second round to advance to the Sweet Sixteen, where they ended a potential Cinderella run from No. 12 seed Oregon. In the Elite Eight, the Cavs beat No. 3 Purdue in overtime; with the win, they advanced to their first Final Four since 1984. They then defeated No. 5 seed Auburn, champions of the Midwest Regional, by a single point.

De'Andre Hunter, a redshirt sophomore, was named NABC Defensive Player of the Year.

Starting lineups

Source

Game summary

Texas Tech did not score its first field goal until 7:22 into the game. The Red Raiders took the lead, 25–24, with 3:57 left in the first half. Virginia's Ty Jerome hit a three-point field goal with less than two seconds left in the first half, to give Virginia a 32–29 lead over Texas Tech at halftime. Virginia kept the lead for much of the second half, but Texas Tech stayed in the game and took the lead, until De'Andre Hunter of Virginia hit a game-tying three point shot with 12 seconds left in regulation. Texas Tech's Jarrett Culver attempted a three-point shot to win the game, but the shot was blocked by Virginia's Braxton Key, and time expired. Texas Tech outscored Virginia 39–36 in the second half, resulting in a 68–68 tie at the end of regulation.

The game went into a five-minute overtime. Matt Mooney of Texas Tech opened overtime with two baskets, including a three-pointer, but Virginia then went on an 11–0 scoring run. Virginia ran out the clock to secure the win with a final score of 85–77.

After the game, Virginia's Kyle Guy was chosen as the NCAA basketball tournament Most Outstanding Player. Hunter finished the game with a career-high 27 points. Culver, meanwhile, struggled during the game while primarily defended by Hunter (NABC Defensive Player of the Year) and scored 15 points while shooting 5-for-22 (.227), including 0-for-6 on three point shots.

See also
 2019 NCAA Division I Women's Basketball Championship Game

References

Championship
NCAA Division I Men's Basketball Championship Games
Texas Tech Red Raiders basketball
Virginia Cavaliers men's basketball
College basketball tournaments in Minnesota
Basketball competitions in Minneapolis
NCAA Division I Men's Basketball Championship Game
NCAA Division I Men's Basketball Championship Game
2010s in Minneapolis